Corey Laveon Beck (born May 27, 1971) is a retired American basketball player. Beck played for the Charlotte Hornets and Detroit Pistons while in the NBA. He played college basketball for South Plains College and the Arkansas Razorbacks.

College career
Beck played collegiately for the University of Arkansas and was a major part of the mid 1990s Razorback teams that won one national championship in 1994 and reached the championship game the following year.

Professional career
He played for the Charlotte Hornets (1995–96, 1997–98, 1998–99) and Detroit Pistons (1998–99) in the NBA for 88 games.

He was also under contract with the Chicago Bulls (October 1996), Vancouver Grizzlies (January 1999) and Minnesota Timberwolves (October 2000), but has not played in any NBA regular season games for them. 

Following his NBA career, he played one season with the Memphis Houn'Dawgs of the ABA.

He also played professionally in Italy for Fila Biella (Serie A2, 2001) and Euro Roseto (Serie A, 2001).

Personal life
In September 2007, Beck and a friend were shot in an attempted robbery in Memphis. Beck was shot in the hand and face and was listed in critical condition following the shooting, but later improved.

References

External links

1971 births
Living people
American expatriate basketball people in Italy
American expatriate basketball people in Lithuania
American expatriate basketball people in Venezuela
American men's basketball players
American shooting survivors
Arkansas Razorbacks men's basketball players
Basketball players from Memphis, Tennessee
BC Žalgiris players
Charlotte Hornets players
Detroit Pistons players
Point guards
Roseto Sharks players
Sioux Falls Skyforce (CBA) players
South Plains Texans basketball players
Undrafted National Basketball Association players
Goodwill Games medalists in basketball
Competitors at the 1994 Goodwill Games